Martijn Padding (born 24 April 1956) is a Dutch composer and educator.

Padding was born in Amsterdam, and was taught by Louis Andriessen (composition), Geert van Keulen (instrumentation) and Fania Chapiro (piano). He also studied sonology at the University of Utrecht. He is the head of the Composition Department at the Royal Conservatory of The Hague, where he has mentored composers such as Katarina Glowicka.

His compositions are often the result of a close working relationship with the musicians themselves. Padding's collaboration, since 1998, with the avant-garde quintet Ensemble LOOS has resulted in a number of works, both with and without electronics. The ensemble played the premiere of the opera Tattooed Tongues, to a libretto by Friso Haverkamp, at the Warsaw Autumn Festival in 2001. Padding's works are performed by prominent ensembles, soloists and orchestras in the Netherlands and abroad.

Additionally he has made radio documentaries, and was the longtime piano accompanist of the modern dance company led by Krisztina de Châtel.

References

Musik Centrum Nederland article by Michel Khalifa (29 September 2009), accessed 8 February 2010

External links
Composer's website, accessed 8 February 2010
November Music Festival 2009 featuring Martijn Padding, accessed 8 February 2010

1956 births
Living people
20th-century classical composers
Dutch male classical composers
Dutch classical composers
Musicians from Amsterdam
Dutch pianists
Academic staff of the Royal Conservatory of The Hague
Pupils of Louis Andriessen
International Rostrum of Composers prize-winners
Male pianists
21st-century pianists
20th-century Dutch male musicians
21st-century male musicians